Sven Kmetsch (born 13 August 1970) is a German former professional footballer who played as a defensive midfielder. He is the assistant manager of Schalke 04 II.

Club career
Kmetsch was born in Bautzen, Saxony. Including his youth career, he spent 14 years at Dynamo Dresden, winning the double in his penultimate season before German reunification, with one of his midfield teammates being Matthias Sammer. After combining East and West German football in the summer of 1991, he would play with the team four consecutive years in the Bundesliga, his competition debut coming on 14 September 1991, in a 3–0 home win against SG Wattenscheid 09.

After Dynamo's double relegation in 1995, Kmetsch spent three seasons with Hamburger SV, enjoying his best year in 1996–97 – 32 games, four goals – but his team could only rank 13th. He subsequently signed for FC Schalke 04, where he would win two consecutive German Cups, being however mostly a backup player during his seven-year spell.

After no appearances whatsoever from 2003 to 2005 combined, Kmetsch retired, having various spells as coach of Schalke's second team. After being released in early 2010, he held talks with TSV Germania Windeck and Bayer Leverkusen II to join Heiko Scholz's coaching staff.

International career
Kmetsch gained two caps for Germany, his debut coming on 10 September 1997, in a 1998 FIFA World Cup qualifier against Armenia, in Dortmund: at half-time, with the score at 0–0 (eventually 4–0), he was replaced by another débutant, Lars Ricken.

His second and final appearance (another start, in a 2–0 win) was made five months later, in a friendly with Oman.

Career statistics

Club

Honours 

DDR-Oberliga: 1989–90
FDGB-Pokal: 1989–90
DFB-Pokal: 2000–01, 2001–02
DFB-Ligapokal: runner-up 2001, 2002

References

External links
 
 
 

1970 births
Living people
German footballers
East German footballers
Association football midfielders
Bundesliga players
Dynamo Dresden II players
Dynamo Dresden players
Hamburger SV players
FC Schalke 04 players
Germany international footballers
German football managers
DDR-Oberliga players
People from Bautzen
Footballers from Saxony
People from Bezirk Dresden